The  Brennabor Typ S, launched in 1922,  was a car introduced by the Brennabor company in order to complement their larger  Typ P model.   In 1925 it was replaced by the Brennabor Typ R which was essentially an updated version of the same model.

The Typ S was powered by a 4-cylinder side-valve engine of 1.57 litres, mounted ahead of the driver and delivering  at 2,200 rpm.   Power was delivered to the rear wheels through a single-plate dry clutch and a three-speed gear box controlled with centrally positioned floor-mounted gear stick.

The car sat on a U-profile pressed-steel chassis with rigid axles and semi-elliptical leaf springing.   In 1922 it was offered only as an open-topped four-seater.   The mechanically linked foot and hand brakes both operated directly against the rear wheels.

By 1925 Brennabor had produced approximately 3,000 Typ Ss

The car was slightly longer and wider (though also slightly lower) than its predecessor and a range of different body types was offered in addition to the open-topped four-seater. A three-door Phaeton model was designated the R4, and a two-door sedan was known as the R8. A two-door “roadster” and a “droschke-laundaulet” were also listed.

The Type R appeared at a time when the German economy was recovering, at least for the time being, from the most savage predations of the post war slump, and by 1928, after three years in production, the company had produced approximately 20,000 Typ Rs.

Technical details

Sources 
 Werner Oswald: Deutsche Autos 1920–1945. Motorbuch Verlag Stuttgart, 10. Auflage (1996), 

Brennabor vehicles